The Central Tano or Akan languages are languages of the Niger-Congo family (or perhaps the theorised Kwa languages) spoken in Ghana and Ivory Coast by the Akan people.

Akan (Primarily in Ghana)
Bia (Primarily in Ivory Coast and Western Ghana)
North Bia
Anyin
Baoulé
Chakosi (Anufo)
Sefwi (Sehwi)
South Bia
Nzema
Ahanta
Jwira-Pepesa

All have written forms in the Latin script.

References

 
Potou–Tano languages